Thomas Roberts (born May 11, 2001) is an American professional soccer player.

Career 
Roberts grew up in Little Rock, Arkansas before moving to Dallas in 2013. 
After five years playing with the FC Dallas Academy, Roberts signed a Homegrown Player contract with Major League Soccer side FC Dallas on July 25, 2018.

On July 6, 2021, Roberts joined Austrian Bundesliga side Austria Klagenfurt on a season-long loan.

Following the 2022 season, his contract option was declined by Dallas.

References

External links 
 
 
 Thomas Roberts at FC Dallas
 

2001 births
Living people
American soccer players
Association football midfielders
United States men's youth international soccer players
Homegrown Players (MLS)
Major League Soccer players
USL League One players
FC Dallas players
North Texas SC players
SK Austria Klagenfurt players
Soccer players from Arkansas
Sportspeople from Little Rock, Arkansas
American expatriate soccer players
American expatriate sportspeople in Austria
Expatriate footballers in Austria
MLS Next Pro players